Hillary Jane Ashton Stiles (born September 25, 1993) is an American Christian musician, who primarily plays a Christian R&B, Christian hip hop, and a Christian pop style of music. She has released two extended plays, Stix and Stones and Stix and Stones Unplugged, both in 2014, with Infiltrate Music.

Early and personal life
Stiles was born, Hillary Jane Ashton Stiles, on September 25, 1993, in Palo Pinto, Texas, the daughter of Duane Michael and Debbie Kay Stiles (née, Johnson). She was raised in Houston, Texas, where she considers it to be her hometown. Stiles got engaged in late 2015 to Roman Flores. They got married in 2016 and now reside in Los Angeles, California.

Music career
HillaryJane started her music career in 2009, performed in 2014 at South by Southwest, and with the release, Stix and Stones, an extended play, on July 29, 2014, with Infiltrate Music. Her subsequent extended play, Stix and Stones Unplugged, was released on December 30, 2014, by Infiltrate Music.

Discography
EPs
 Stix and Stones (July 29, 2014, Infiltrate)
 Stix and Stones Unplugged (December 30, 2014, Infiltrate)

References

External links
 Record label website

1993 births
Living people
Christian music songwriters
Musicians from Houston
Musicians from Los Angeles
Singer-songwriters from Texas
Singer-songwriters from California
American performers of Christian hip hop music
American women singer-songwriters
American women pop singers
American women hip hop musicians
People from Palo Pinto County, Texas
Christianity in Houston
American contemporary R&B singers
21st-century American women singers
21st-century American singers